Flying the Foam and Some Fancy Diving is a 1906 British short  silent comedy film, directed by James Williamson, featuring a man diving from Brighton Pier while mounted on a bicycle, in both forward and reverse motion. This trick film, according to Michael Brooke of BFI Screenonline, "adds additional layers of entertainment, firstly by showing the stunt from multiple angles (or rather several stunts, as the surrounding crowds differ from shot to shot) and then by showing it in reverse motion so that Reddish appears to be performing the impossible feat of riding his bicycle vertically out of the sea". It is believed to be an extended version of Professor Reddish Performing his Celebrated Bicycle Dive from Brighton West Pier (1902), supplemented by more conventional footage of pier divers at a later date.

References

External links

1900s British films
British black-and-white films
British silent short films
Films directed by James Williamson (film pioneer)
1906 comedy films
1906 films
1906 short films
British comedy short films
Cycling films
Silent comedy films